Mountain sickness can refer to:

 Altitude sickness or acute mountain sickness, a pathological condition that is caused by acute exposure to low air pressure
 Chronic mountain sickness, a disease that can develop during extended time living at altitude